The 1969 winners of the Torneo di Viareggio (in English, the Viareggio Tournament, officially the Viareggio Cup World Football Tournament Coppa Carnevale), the annual youth football tournament held in Viareggio, Tuscany, are listed below.

Format
The 16 teams are organized in knockout rounds. The round of 16 are played in two-legs, while the rest of the rounds are single tie.

Participating teams
Italian teams

  Atalanta
  Bologna
  Fiorentina
  Inter Milan
  Juventus
  Milan
  Napoli
  Pisa

European teams

  Eintracht Frankfurt
  Dukla Praha
  Vojvodina
  Motor Lublin
  CSKA Sofia
  Benfica
  Vasas Budapest
  Espanyol

Tournament fixtures

Champions

Footnotes

External links
 Official Site (Italian)
 Results on RSSSF.com

1969
1968–69 in Italian football
1968–69 in Yugoslav football
1968–69 in Spanish football
1968–69 in German football
1968–69 in Czechoslovak football
1968–69 in Portuguese football
1968–69 in Bulgarian football
1968–69 in Hungarian football
1968–69 in Polish football